Road Rules: South Pacific is the twelfth season of the MTV reality television series Road Rules. Taking place in the South Pacific, it was filmed during February and March 2003. A casting special aired on May 19, 2003, and the season premiered one week later on May 26, 2003. This season's working title was Road Rules: South Seas, as heard in their first episode when the cast read their welcome letters.

Cast

Original cast members

Replacements

Duration of cast 

 Table key
  = Cast Member is featured on this episode.
  = Cast Member replaces another cast member.
  = Cast Member is voted out of the show.
  = Cast Member is removed from the show.
Notes

Missions

Episodes

After filming

The entire cast of this season was trained in public speaking by American University's Department of Communications.

Cara Zavaleta was named Playmate of the Month for November 2004 after the show had already aired.

In 2005, Chris Graebe and his wife Jenni welcomed their son, Kaden Christopher.

In 2007, Mary Beth Decker welcomed her first son, Gavin.

David Giuntoli has become an actor. He's best known for playing Detective Nick Burkhardt in the TV series Grimm. In 2017, he married Bitsie Tulloch. Their first daughter, Vivian, was born on February 14, 2019.

Jeremy Blossom is the Co-Founder and CEO of Strikepoint Media, he is married and has two kids.

Abram returned to the series as part of the alumni cast of Road Rules 2007: Viewers' Revenge. After dating fellow Challenge cast member Cara Maria Sorbello, Boise proposed to Rachel Missie in 2019. The couple married in Montana on June 1, 2019. In 2020, Boise and Missie announced they were expecting their first child. Their son, Atlas Young Boise, was born on April 22, 2021. The couple separated shortly after.

The Challenge

Challenge in bold indicates that the contestant was a finalist on The Challenge.

Note: Tina appeared on Cutthroat for an elimination.

References

External links

Road Rules
2003 American television seasons